This page documents the tornadoes and tornado outbreaks of 1958, primarily in the United States. Most tornadoes form in the U.S., although some events may take place internationally. Tornado statistics for older years like this often appear significantly lower than modern years due to fewer reports or confirmed tornadoes.

Events

1958 featured widespread tornado activity across the entire United States. Several strong tornadoes even impacted California, causing significant damage, but no casualties. The most active and deadliest month was June, which featured several violent tornadoes and 43 fatalities.

United States yearly total

January
There were 11 tornadoes confirmed in the US in January.

January 1 (Manitoba)
A tornado was confirmed in Amaranth, Manitoba. Damage information is unknown.

January 10
A rare F0 tornado hit Crescent City, California. There was only minor damage with no casualties being reported.

January 24
An isolated, but strong F2 tornado tore through Cochran, Georgia, injuring 16.

February
There were 20 tornadoes confirmed in the US in February.

February 3
A brief, but rare F0 tornado struck Gualala Point Island south of Gualala, California. There were no casualties.

February 26–27

A destructive and deadly outbreak of 16 tornadoes hit the Southeast. The first tornado to cause casualties on February 26 was a short-lived, but strong F2 tornado that injured two on the south side of Hosston, Louisiana. Three destructive tornadoes then struck Mississippi. The first one was a long-tracked F3 tornado that moved directly through Downtown Jackson, killing eight and 26 injuries on its 69.7 mile path. Just 10 minutes after that tornado touched down, an even longer-tracked F3 tornado touched down further to the east, striking Harrisville, Piney Woods, Walnut Grove, and Madden, killing one and injuring 34 on its 71-mile-path. Further to the south, an F2 tornado pummeled the towns of White Sand, Hillsdale, and Eastern Lumberton, injuring nine.

Later that evening, another F2 tornado tracked through Gulf Hills, Vancleave, and Hurley, Mississippi, injuring one. A catastrophic F3 tornado then tore through the rural Mississippi counties of Perry, Greene, and Wayne, killing four and injuring 20. The final strong tornado of the event took place just before midnight when a brief, but destructive F3 tornado hit Savannah, Tennessee, although there were no casualties. Two weak tornadoes touched down the next day before the outbreak came to an end. In the end, the tornadoes killed 13 and injured 92.

February 28
A rare F0 tornado moved through O'Neals, California. There were no casualties.

March
There were 15 tornadoes confirmed in the US in March.

March 12
A rare F0 tornado touched down in Madera, California. There were no casualties, but some minor damage did occur.

March 28
A rare, strong 200-yard-wide F2 tornado touched down in McKinleyville, California. While there were no casualties, major damage was reported along the 2.0-mile-path.

April
There were 76 tornadoes confirmed in the US in April.

April 1–6

A tornado outbreak sequence of 32 tornadoes hit areas from California to Virginia. It started with four tornadoes on April 1, including three rare early to late-morning F1 tornadoes that touched down in California. The first one caused considerable damage to the San Francisco International Airport. The second one struck the town of Cortez. the final one struck the southeastern side of Laguna Beach. There were no casualties from the tornadoes. Four tornadoes touched down the next day, all of which caused casualties. A brief, but damaging F1 tornado injured one north of South Union, Kentucky. A large, half-mile wide F1 tornado then hit Fletcher and Cement, Oklahoma, injuring one as well. In Texas, a deadly F3 tornado struck Wichita Falls, killing one and injuring 14. Another F3 tornado hit Stoneburg, injuring one.

After minimal tornado activity from April 3–4, a deadly outbreak of 17 tornadoes struck the Midwest and Alabama on April 5. It started with a long-tracked late-morning F1 tornado that struck Remsen, Eastern Alton, and Western Newkirk, Iowa, injuring one on its 37-mile path. That afternoon, a deadly, long-tracked F3 tornado tore through New Athens, Fayetteville, New Memphis Station, Damiansville, Breese, Hagarstown, and Western Vandalia, Illinois, killing one and injuring eight on its 60.5 mile path. An F1 tornado then injured one in rural Perry County, Missouri. Back in Illinois, another F3 tornado struck Vergennes, the DuQuoin State Fairgrounds in Southern Du Quoin, and Sesser, injuring 11.

As tornado activity wound down in the Midwest that evening, it quickly began to pick up in Alabama. An F2 tornado struck Leighton, Wheeler Darn Village, and Rogersville, killing one and injuring another. Later, another F2 tornado passed through areas just east of the killer tornado, causing mostly heavy tree damage in rural Lawrence and Limestone Counties. Just after midnight on April 6, the final strong F3 tornado of the outbreak sequence tore through Albertville, the west sides of Hustleville, Asbury, and Grove Oak, and Section, injuring one. The outbreak ended later that afternoon when a weak, but damaging F1 tornado moved through Hampton, Virginia, although it caused no casualties.

Overall, the tornadoes killed three and injured 40.

April 15

An intense, localized outbreak of five tornadoes hit Florida and Georgia. It started with a brief, but violent F4 tornado striking Bereah, Florida (although some experts rated it as an F3 tornado due to poor construction of the structures), injuring seven. Later, an F3 tornado (some experts rate it as an F2 tornado) tore through Northern Anastasia Island, Florida, injuring nine. Another F3 storm then became the most damaging tornado of the day when it moved directly through Anglevillas and Fort Pierce, Florida, injuring 20. Overall, the outbreak injured 36.

April 21–22

An outbreak of 11 tornadoes impacted the Southern Plains and the Southeast. On April 21, a disastrous, .25-mile-wide F2 tornado hit the Southern Dallas suburbs of Midlothian and Forreston, injuring 18.The next day, an F2 tornado struck Southern Lone Star and Northern Summerton, South Carolina, killing one and injuring another. A brief but destructive F1 tornado then caused major damage just southwest of Downtown West Palm Beach, Florida, injuring three. Further to the south, another brief F1 tornado then struck Downtown Delray Beach, although there were no casualties. In the end, the outbreak killed one and injured 22.

April 23–24

A small outbreak of five tornadoes hit the Mississippi Valley while a rare tornado struck Washington. Just before midnight on April 23, an isolated F1 tornado damaged the Northwestern St. Louis suburb of Bridgeton, Missouri. The next day, a highly unusual long-tracked F0 tornado tracked 45 miles through rural Walla Walla County, Washington, causing little to no damage. Thousands of miles away, a stronger, long-tracked F2 tornado hit Arlington Plantation, Louisiana, before crossing the Mississippi River into Mississippi and striking the towns of Mayersville and Belzoni, causing major damage on its 58.7-mile-path. Despite the destruction, none of the tornadoes caused any casualties.

May
There were 68 tornadoes confirmed in the US in May. This was also the first time that May produced no tornado-related fatalities in the US since modern records began in 1950.

May 15–16 (Poland)

Two destructive tornadoes hit Rawa Mazowiecka and Nowe Miasto in Poland. There were three fatalities and over 100 injuries.

May 22

An F2 tornado struck Logan Elm Village, Circleville, and Stoutsville, Ohio, injuring three. Thousands of miles away, an unusual F1 tornado passed over Tule Lake west of Homestead, California with no casualties.

May 24–25

Three destructive tornadoes struck four states over two days. On May 24, a long-tracked F3 tornado first touched down northeast of Minneapolis in Eastern Hugo, Minnesota. It then tracked 15.1 miles southeastward through the eastern suburbs of Withrow, the west sides of Stillwater, Oak Park Heights, and Bayport, and Northern Lakeland, injuring six. It then crossed the St. Croix River into Wisconsin, where it tracked 44.3 miles, striking the towns of Southern Hudson, Northern River Falls, Lawton, El Paso, Waverly, Exile, and Arkansaw, injuring an additional six before dissipating. In total, the tornado traveled 59.4 miles and injured 12.

April 25 saw two stray, but strong F2 tornadoes. The first one caused heavy damage to Will Rogers World Airport in Southwest Oklahoma City. The second one was brief, but it struck Decatur, Alabama, injuring one. Overall, the three tornadoes injured 13.

May 27 – June 2

A modest outbreak sequence of 23 tornadoes hit areas from California and Illinois. The first major tornado occurred on May 30 when an F3 tornado tore through rural Benson County, North Dakota. Right at midnight on May 31, an F1 tornado injured one in Kampville, Missouri north of St. Louis. Later, an F2 tornado injured two in Rolling Prairie, Indiana. In Kansas, an F3 tornado hit areas northwest of Labette. June 1 saw a rare F2 tornado track 15 miles through Valley Ford and Fredericks, California, causing major damage, but no casualties before dissipating southwest of Roseland and Santa Rosa. The final tornado of the outbreak was an F1 tornado in Columbia, Alabama. In the end, the outbreak sequence injured three.

June
There were 128 tornadoes confirmed in the US in June.

June 3–4

A violent outbreak of 13 tornadoes struck the Upper Midwest. On June 4, large F2 tornado passed through Avon and Collegeville, Minnesota just west of St. Cloud, injuring two. At the same time, a brief F1 tornado injured one west of St. Martin, Minnesota. The worst tornadoes later occurred in Wisconsin. A large, violent, long-tracked, half-mile wide F5 tornado (some experts rated it as an F4 tornado) tore through Wildwood, Southern Knapp, Cedar Falls, Tainter Lake, and Northwestern Colfax, killing 21 and injuring 74. After that, an F3 tornado injured three in Cadott. An F2 tornado then touched down and caused mostly tree damage, although some barns were destroyed, in rural Rusk and Sawyer Counties. The final tornado, another violent, long tracked, half-mile wide F4 tornado, struck Fall Creek before moving through rural Eau Claire, Clark, and Marathon Counties, killing four and injuring three.

In the end, the outbreak killed 28, all in Northwestern Wisconsin, injured 133, and caused $83.275 million (1957 USD) in damage.

June 10

A small, but destructive outbreak of five tornadoes impacted Iowa, Missouri, and Kansas. The only tornado to cause casualties was a violent F4 tornado (which may have reached F5 intensity) that struck El Dorado, Kansas, damaging or destroying numerous brand new homes, including some that were leveled and completely swept away, leaving only a bare slab. A total of 15 people were killed and five (Grazulis says 50) others were injured.  An F2 tornado also caused heavy damage in the Northwestern St. Louis suburb of O'Fallon, Missouri.

July
There were 121 confirmed tornadoes in the US in July.

July 1–2

A deadly F1 tornado struck Leander Lake, Minnesota, killing one and injuring two. Five other tornadoes touched down in Oklahoma, Colorado, and Nebraska, including an F2 tornado that hit Lodgepole and Western Sedgwick, Nebraska. The next day saw eight more tornadoes with the worst being an F2 tornado that caused major damage and injured two in Billings, Montana. Four F0 tornadoes touched down in Nebraska as well along with three F1 tornadoes in Maine.

July 10–11

A damaging outbreak of 22 tornadoes struck the Great Plains, Great Lakes, and New England. The first tornado of the outbreak was a weak F1 tornado that hit Panama, Nebraska.  Another F1 tornado caused major damage in Oakwood, Illinois. The next day, the first F2 tornado of the outbreak briefly touched down northwest of Watson, Kansas. Later, a long-tracked F2 tornado struck Bennington, Maple Grove, and West Salem, Illinois, injuring two. Later in Massachusetts, an F2 tornado hit Millers Falls. Another F2 tornado hit areas northwest of Bedford. The worst tornado, which was also rated F2, then touched down in Western Cincinnati before crossing the Ohio River and striking Ludlow, Kentucky, injuring eight. The final strong tornado, which was also the strongest as it was rated F3, of the outbreak then struck areas southeast of Charleston, Illinois while moving in an odd southwest direction, injuring three. In the end, the outbreak injured 12.<

August
There were 46 tornadoes confirmed in the US in August.

August 4

An F1 tornado killed one and injured two in Lucan, Minnesota. A brief F1 tornado also touched down east of Madison, Nebraska, causing no casualties, but still doing considerable damage.

August 7
An isolated, but strong F2 tornado moved through Northwestern Milwaukee, injuring four.

September
There were 24 tornadoes confirmed in the US in September.

September 6–7

Five scattered tornadoes touched down across the Great Plains and New England. On September 6, an isolated, but strong F3 tornado caused considerable damage south of Valley City, North Dakota. The next day, an F2 tornado injured two northwest of Willington, Connecticut. Later, a brief, weak, but surprisingly deadly F0 tornado killed one and injured another in Northwestern Duxbury, Massachusetts. Overall, the tornadoes killed one and injured three.

October
There were 9 tornadoes confirmed in the US in October.

October 8–9

Four tornadoes struck the Midwest over a two-day period. On October 8, an F3 tornado struck Oxford, Missouri, killing two and injuring seven. A long-tracked F2 tornado then tore an 81-mile path of destruction through Davis, Harrison, Roscoe, Hunter, Chemung, Harvard, Greenwood, Ringwood, Pistakke Highlands, Fox Lake, Ingleside Shore, Round Lake Heights, Round Lake Beach, Venetian Village, Grandwood Park, Gurnee and Northwestern Waukegan, Illinois, killing one. The next day in Wisconsin, a brief, but strong F2 tornado caused mainly tree damage west of Burkhardt. The final tornado was a weak F0 twister over the Yahara River southwest of Lake Windsor, causing little to no damage. In the end, the small outbreak killed three and injured seven.

October 19

Two damaging early-morning tornadoes touched down in Florida. The first tornado was an F1 twister that caused considerable damage in Southern Osprey.

October 31
An isolated, but strong F3 tornado struck Snead Island as well as the Palmetto Historic District in Palmetto, Florida, causing major damage and injuring four.

November
There were 45 tornadoes confirmed in the US in November.

November 13–17

A large tornado outbreak sequence struck the Great Plains and the Mississippi Valley with 34 of the 43 tornadoes from the outbreak occurring on November 17, although the first tornado to cause casualties happened on November 14. An F2 tornado injured one northwest of Pace, Louisiana on that day.

Tornado activity on November 17 began early that morning when a brief, but strong F2 tornado touched down northwest of Curranville, Kansas. Later in Texas, another F2 tornado struck Weinert, injuring seven. An F1 tornado impacted Throckmorton, injuring four. An F2 tornado then injured one in Olney.

Stronger tornadoes then began to impact Oklahoma. A long-tracked F3 tornado impacted Loveland and Walters, injuring four on its 65.8 mile path. Another long-tracked F3 tornado then struck the towns of Fairmont, Garber, Western Billings, and Blackwell, causing major damage. Later, an F1 tornado injured four in Dickson. A destructive F3 tornado struck Bowlegs and Sportsman Lake, injuring 15.

More tornado activity then occurred in Kansas. Later, an F2 tornado caused major damage in rural Leavenworth County. Another damaging F2 tornado occurred just northeast of Pomona.

Just before noon, tornadoes began to touch down in Missouri. A large, long-tracked F3 tornado caused major destruction in Moundville and Nevada, injuring one. That afternoon, an F2 tornado caused heavy damage in Galt. Another F2 tornado then damaged Blue Ridge.

The final tornado of the outbreak was an F2 tornado that caused heavy damage in Marcus, Lambert, and Bismarck, Arkansas. In the end, the outbreak caused no fatalities, but there were 37 injuries.

November 28

Two short-lived, but destructive F2 tornadoes (possibly from the same storm) hit Georgia that afternoon. The first one caused heavy damage in the town of Listonia. The second one was even more destructive as it moved directly through Chauncey, injuring one.

December
There was 1 tornado confirmed in the US in December.

December 11
The only tornado in the United States, during the month, occurred on this day, when a brief, but damaging F1 tornado injured one north of South Sarasota, Florida.

December 28 (United Kingdom)
A tornado, rated F1/T2 by the European Severe Storms Laboratory struck Colyford, England. It was noted that a damage survey was conducted by a “severe weather expert” with no further information given.

See also
 Tornado
 Tornadoes by year
 Tornado records
 Tornado climatology
 Tornado myths
 List of tornado outbreaks
 List of F5 and EF5 tornadoes
 List of North American tornadoes and tornado outbreaks
 List of 21st-century Canadian tornadoes and tornado outbreaks
 List of European tornadoes and tornado outbreaks
 List of tornadoes and tornado outbreaks in Asia
 List of Southern Hemisphere tornadoes and tornado outbreaks
 List of tornadoes striking downtown areas
 List of tornadoes with confirmed satellite tornadoes
 Tornado intensity
 Fujita scale
 Enhanced Fujita scale

References

 
1958 meteorology
Tornado-related lists by year
Torn